Welgemoed is a surname. Notable people with the surname include:

 Shaun Morgan (born 1978), South African musician; full name Shaun Morgan Welgemoed
 Willem Welgemoed (1925–1992), South African diver

See also
 Wohlgemuth, surname